Çaush (romanized: Tsaoúsi) is a village in Vlorë County, southern Albania. At the 2015 local government reform it became part of the municipality of Finiq. It is inhabited solely by Greeks.

Etymology
The name of the village is of Albanian origin.

Demographics 
According to Ottoman statistics, the village had 128 inhabitants in 1895. The village had 718 inhabitants in 1993, all ethnically Greeks.

References

External links 
Photo compilation depicting the village
Resurrection of Jesus celebration in Tsaousi, 2019

Villages in Vlorë County
Greek communities in Albania
Villages in Albania
Labëria